The Cobourg Kodiaks, originally the Kitchener-Waterloo Kodiaks, are a Major Series Lacrosse team located in Cobourg Ontario. They are a Senior "A" box lacrosse team, which play in the Major Series Lacrosse league. The MSL consists of six teams, including the Kodiaks. Most of the players in this league play or have played in the National Lacrosse League (NLL). Each year, the MSL playoff teams battle for the right to compete against the Western Lacrosse Association champion for the highly prized Mann Cup. The championship is hosted alternately between Ontario and British Columbia every year. The Kodiaks play eighteen games throughout their season, with their nine home games being played out of the Cobourg Community Centre, or CCC.

History 
The Kitchener-Waterloo Kodiaks were officially renamed, as well as moved, to Cobourg Ontario as the Cobourg Kodiaks on February 1, 2016. Their first season in their new home was the 2016 regular season, with their first home game occurring on May 29, 2016. Joey Cupido is their inaugural captain.

Season-by-Season Results

External links 
 Cobourg Kodiaks

References  

Lacrosse teams in Ontario